, better known as  was a professional wrestler from Yokohama, Japan. In the 1970s, while wrestling for All Japan Women's Pro-Wrestling (AJW), she formed the tag team, the Beauty Pair, with Maki Ueda. Following in the steps of Mach Fumiake, the Beauty Pair was part of an important shift in the culture of Japanese women's wrestling, attracting more female fans by becoming pop icons.  In their mainstream success, Satō and Ueda paved the way for the Crush Gals of the 1980s.

Career
Though she had played basketball in high school, Sato became a professional wrestler after graduation. She joined the AJW  in 1975 and was part of the 1975 AJW rookie class alongside Maki Ueda and Yumi Ikeshita. She had her debut match against her future tag team partner, Maki Ueda, on April 27 of that year. On February 24, 1976, the Beauty Pair was formed, and they won the WWWA World Tag Team Championship that night. During their championship reign throughout most of 1976, the Pair created excitement by using their top ten hit single to announce their entrance, and were regularly feted by their adoring fans who threw confetti and streamers into the ring.

Sato also had success as a singles wrestler. She won the WWWA World Single Championship on November 1, 1977, from Maki Ueda in a Beauty Pair showdown, and held it twice more during the late 1970s, defeating Monster Ripper and Nancy Kumi. She lost the title the final time to the younger Jaguar Yokota on February 25, 1981. On February 27, 1979, Sato defeated her former partner, Ueda, in a "loser retires" match.  Satō's own retirement ceremony was held on May 21, 1981.

In 1986, inspired by the current boom in interest in women's wrestling in Japan due to the success of the Crush Gals, Sato, along with wrestler Nancy Kumi, boxer Rumi Kazama, and others, formed the first women's promotion to compete against the AJW monopoly, Japan Women's Pro-Wrestling (JWP). Satō returned from retirement on JWP's first show on August 17, 1986 in a match against Shinobu Kandori. Sato was involved in an infamous incident on July 18, 1987 when a match involving her and Shinobu Kandori turned into a shoot match. This incident led to her retiring for a second and final time on March 20, 1988. Under Sato's influence, JWP did not offer the "mandatory retirement" policy common in AJW, allowing female wrestlers to compete until they wished to retire, rather than until the promoters ordered them to retire. AJW eventually dropped the mandatory retirement policy in the 1990s.

Sato attended the AJW thirtieth anniversary show in 1998. She died on August 9, 1999, due to stomach cancer.

Championships and accomplishments
All Japan Women's Pro-Wrestling
WWWA World Single Championship (3 times)
WWWA World Tag Team Championship (3 times)—with Maki Ueda (2) and Nancy Kumi (1)
AJW Hall of Fame (1998)
Tokyo Sports
Service Award (1999)
Wrestling Observer Newsletter
Wrestling Observer Newsletter Hall of Fame (Class of 1996)

See also

 List of premature professional wrestling deaths

References

1957 births
1999 deaths
Japanese female professional wrestlers
Sportspeople from Yokohama
Professional wrestling executives
Deaths from stomach cancer
Deaths from cancer in Japan
20th-century professional wrestlers